This is the list of awards and nominations received by the television series Saving Grace (2007–2010).

By Awards

Emmy Awards
2008: Outstanding Actress - Drama Series (Holly Hunter for playing "Grace Hanadarko", nominated)
2009: Outstanding Actress - Drama Series (Holly Hunter for playing "Grace Hanadarko", nominated)

Golden Globe Awards
2007: Best Actress - Drama Series (Holly Hunter for playing "Grace Hanadarko", nominated)

Screen Actors Guild
2007: Outstanding Actress - Drama Series (Holly Hunter for playing "Grace Hanadarko", (nominated)
2008: Outstanding Actress - Drama Series (Holly Hunter for playing "Grace Hanadarko", (nominated)
2009: Outstanding Actress - Drama Series (Holly Hunter for playing "Grace Hanadarko", (nominated)

Young Artist Awards
*2007: Best Young Actor Aged Ten or Under - TV Series (Dylan Minnette for playing "Clay", won)

Satellite Awards
2008: Best Actress - Television Series - Drama (Holly Hunter for playing "Grace Hanadarko", (nominated)
2009: Best Actress - Television Series - Drama (Holly Hunter for playing "Grace Hanadarko", (nominated)

People's Choice Awards
2009: Best TV Drama Diva - (Holly Hunter for playing "Grace Hanadarko", (nominated)

By year

2007
Golden Globe Award: Best Actress - Drama Series (Holly Hunter, nominated)
Screen Actors Guild: Outstanding Actress - Drama Series (Holly Hunter, nominated)
Young Artist Award: Best Young Actor Aged Ten or Under - TV Series (Dylan Minnette, won)

2008
Emmy Award: Outstanding Actress - Drama Series (Holly Hunter, nominated) 
Screen Actors Guild: Outstanding Actress - Drama Series (Holly Hunter, nominated)
Satellite Awards: Best Actress - Television Series - Drama (Holly Hunter for playing "Grace Hanadarko", (nominated)

2009
Screen Actors Guild: Outstanding Actress - Drama Series (Holly Hunter for playing "Grace Hanadarko", (nominated)
Satellite Awards: Best Actress - Television Series - Drama (Holly Hunter for playing "Grace Hanadarko", (nominated)
People's Choice Awards: Favorite TV Drama Diva - (Holly Hunter for playing "Grace Hanadarko", (nominated)
Emmy Award: Outstanding Actress - Drama Series (Holly Hunter, nominated)

Saving Grace